"Sleep" was the second single by Marion, released in February 1995. It reached number 53 on the UK Singles Chart.
The track was re-recorded and released as The Sleep EP the following year.

Track listing
All tracks by Harding/Grantham/Cunningham, words by Harding.

7" vinyl
 "Sleep"
 "Father's Day"

12" vinyl and CD
 "Sleep"
 "Father's Day"
 "Moving Fast"

Personnel
 Jaime Harding - vocals, harmonica
 Tony Grantham - guitar
 Phil Cunningham - guitar
 Julian Phillips - bass
 Murad Mousa - drums

Marion (band) songs
1995 singles
1996 singles
1995 songs
Songs written by Phil Cunningham (rock musician)
London Records singles
Songs written by Jaime Harding